Merrifieldia chordodactylus is a moth of the family Pterophoridae. It is found on the Canary Islands and in Spain. It has also been recorded from Algeria and Morocco.

The larvae possibly feed on Lavandula abrotanoides and fernleaf lavender (Lavandula multifida).

References

chordodactylus
Moths described in 1859
Plume moths of Africa
Plume moths of Europe
Taxa named by Otto Staudinger